Panchakuta Basadi may refer to:

 Panchakuta Basadi, Kambadahalli, a temple complex in the village of Kambadahalli, Karnataka, India
 Panchakuta Basadi, Humcha, an ancient temple in the village of Humcha, Karnataka, India